The 2018 Humpty's Champions Cup is the final Grand Slam of curling event of the 2017–18 curling season. It was held April 24–29, 2018 at the WinSport Arena, Canada Olympic Park, in Calgary, Alberta.

Men

Teams
The teams are listed as follows:

Round-robin standings

Tiebreakers

Playoffs

Quarterfinals
April 28, 4:00pm

Semifinals
April 28, 8:00pm

Final
April 29, 2:00pm

Women

Teams
The teams are listed as follows:

Round-robin standings

Tiebreakers
April 27, 8:00pm

April 28, 8:30am

Playoffs

Quarterfinals
April 28, 12:00pm

Semifinals
April 28, 8:00pm

Final
April 29, 10:00am

Qualification

Men

Women

Notes

References

Champions Cup (curling)
2018 in Canadian curling
Curling in Alberta
2018 in Alberta
Sport in Calgary
April 2018 sports events in Canada